John Wesley Harding is a 1967 Bob Dylan album.

John Wesley Harding may also refer to:
 "John Wesley Harding" (song), the title track of the Dylan album
 John Wesley Harding (singer) (born 1965), English singer
 John Wesley Harding (2011 album), a cover of the Dylan album by Thea Gilmore

See also
 John Wesley Hardin (1853–1895), American gun-fighter